The 2021 NASCAR Xfinity Series was the 40th season of the NASCAR Xfinity Series, a stock car racing series sanctioned by NASCAR in the United States. The season began at Daytona International Speedway with the Beef. It's What's for Dinner. 300 on February 13. The regular season ended with the Food City 300 at Bristol Motor Speedway on September 17. The NASCAR playoffs ended with the NASCAR Xfinity Series Championship Race at Phoenix Raceway on November 6.

Following the Food City 300 at Bristol Motor Speedway, A. J. Allmendinger of Kaulig Racing clinched the Regular Season Championship. Chevrolet took the Manufacturer Championship following the Dead On Tools 250 at Martinsville Speedway. At the season finale, Daniel Hemric of Joe Gibbs Racing scored his first career win and claimed the Xfinity Series championship. It was also the first Xfinity Series championship for the Toyota Supra.

Teams and drivers

Complete schedule

Limited schedule

Notes

Changes

Teams
 On September 22, 2020, Kaulig Racing owner Matt Kaulig revealed on reporter Kelly Crandall's podcast that he hoped that his team would expand to three full-time cars plus one part-time car for the 2021 season. The team did end up expanding to three full-time cars, as the No. 16 of A. J. Allmendinger will go from part-time to full-time. In terms of the fourth part-time car, Ross Chastain appears to be a potential driver for it, as he has expressed interest in continuing with the team part-time after he moves to the Cup Series full-time.
 On November 4, 2020, it was announced that Rick Ware Racing would be fielding two full-time Xfinity Series teams. The team returned to the series to attempt two races in late 2020 after about a year and a half away, reviving the No. 17 car. Despite this announcement, it was later revealed on February 6, 2021 that RWR would only be fielding the No. 17, which would have an alliance with SS-Green Light Racing, similar to the partnership they had with them for No. 07 car in 2020. On April 6, 2021, RWR announced that the No. 17 driven by Joey Gase would be renumbered to the No. 28 with a Havoline-inspired paint scheme for the Talladega race to honor the late Davey Allison. Gase would also drive the No. 28 (renumbered from the No. 53) at the spring Talladega Cup race.
 On December 3, 2020, it was revealed that DGM Racing would be fielding a fourth car for the first time, with team owner Mario Gosselin piloting the No. 91 in the season-opener at Daytona for his first Xfinity start as a driver since 2017. The car was also on the entry list the following week at the Daytona Road Course with Preston Pardus, but it was excluded from the field due to lack of owner points with the entry list having over 40 cars, and Pardus replaced Caesar Bacarella in the team's No. 90. It is unclear if the car will attempt additional races later in the season.
 On December 10, 2020, Richard Childress Racing announced the revival of their No. 2 car, which will be driven full-time by Myatt Snider, who drove for them part-time in 2020. It has yet to be announced if RCR's No. 21 will run part-time in, or not run at all 2021.
 On December 11, 2020, Our Motorsports announced that they would be expanding to two full-time cars in the Xfinity Series in 2021. The second car will be driven by multiple drivers, beginning with 2018 and 2019 series champion Tyler Reddick at Daytona, Whelen Modified Tour driver Patrick Emerling, ARCA Menards Series West driver Blaine Perkins, and additional drivers that have yet to be announced. Team owner Chris Our confirmed on SiriusXM NASCAR Radio on December 14, 2020 that the number would be the No. 03. After the No. 03 failed to qualify for the races with no practice and qualifying due to owner points with entry lists of over 40 cars, Our Motorsports purchased the points of the No. 23 car from RSS/Reaume Brothers Racing for the remainder of the season starting at Las Vegas in March.
 On January 19, 2021, Big Machine Records founder Scott Borchetta announced that he and the company were starting a full-time Xfinity Series team, Big Machine Racing, which will field the No. 48 Chevrolet. The team bought cars and equipment from RSS Racing/Reaume Brothers Racing's No. 93 car in 2020.
 On January 21, 2021, it was announced that the RSS Racing/Reaume Brothers Racing No. 93 car would be renumbered to the No. 23 for 2021, and that the team would receive newer cars and equipment that were previously used by the RSS No. 39 car, which switches to Ford in 2021. The old No. 93 cars and equipment were sold to Big Machine Racing.
 On January 25, 2021, Jordan Anderson Racing announced that they would be expanding into the Xfinity Series in 2021, fielding the No. 31 car full-time for driver/team owner Jordan Anderson, competing for Rookie of the Year honors. The team used Chevrolets acquired from Richard Childress Racing.
 On February 2, 2021, it was announced that the Bassett brothers, Ronnie and Dillon, would be starting their own Xfinity team for 2021, the No. 77 Chevrolet, which would be fielded full-time with both of them as well as other drivers sharing the car.
 On February 23, 2021, Joe Gibbs Racing revealed that they would be fielding a fifth car, the No. 81, at Road America for Ty Gibbs, which is a race where Kyle Busch will be in the No. 54, the car that Gibbs is running his part-time schedule for the team in.
 On March 5, 2021, it was announced that Whelen Euro Series driver Loris Hezemans, who made his Xfinity debut in 2019 at Road America, would return to the series to make two starts, both on ovals, in the MBM Motorsports No. 13. In those two races, the car will be fielded in a collaboration with Reaume Brothers Racing. MBM owner Carl Long said on Facebook the following day that the deal for RBR to partner with his team for Hezemans' races came as a result of Reaume's own No. 23 car being sold to Our Motorsports.

Drivers
 On September 15, 2020, it was announced that 2019 and 2020 ARCA Menards Series East champion Sam Mayer would move up to the Xfinity Series, driving the JR Motorsports No. 8 car. He will run the second half of the 2021 season after he turns 18 and is eligible to race in the series before running full-time for them in 2022.
 On September 21, 2020, it was announced that Ross Chastain would be moving up to the Cup Series full-time in 2021, driving the No. 42 for Chip Ganassi Racing, therefore vacating the No. 10 for Kaulig Racing, his full-time Xfinity ride in 2020. Chastain then revealed on September 22 that he has plans to return to the team for a part-time schedule, although this did not end up happening.
 On October 22, 2020, it was announced that JR Motorsports CARS Late Model Stock Tour driver and 2020 NASCAR Advance Auto Parts Weekly Series champion Josh Berry would race in the Xfinity Series part-time for JRM, sharing the team's No. 8 car with Mayer. Berry will drive in 12 races during the first half of the season before Mayer's 18th birthday. He drove part-time in the Xfinity Series for the team from 2014 to 2016 as well as one start with Obaika Racing in 2016 and another with NextGen Motorsports in 2017, which was his most recent start in the series.
 On November 12, 2020, Joe Gibbs Racing announced that Daniel Hemric would drive their No. 18 full-time in 2021, replacing Riley Herbst. Hemric drove the JR Motorsports No. 8 part-time in 2020. On November 12, 2020, Frontstretch reported that Herbst is expected to go to Stewart Haas Racing to drive their No. 98 full-time in 2021, replacing Chase Briscoe, who moved up to SHR's No. 14 car in the Cup Series, replacing the recently retired Clint Bowyer. The official announcement of Herbst driving the No. 98 came on December 10, 2020.
 On November 16, 2020, Kaulig Racing announced that Jeb Burton would drive their No. 10 full-time in 2020, replacing Ross Chastain, who moved up to the Cup Series full-time in 2021 with Chip Ganassi Racing in the No. 42 car. Burton previously spent a number of years in the series running part-time for various teams, most recently the No. 8 for JR Motorsports in 2019 and 2020.
 On December 1, 2020, Kaulig Racing announced that A. J. Allmendinger would drive the No. 16 full-time in 2021, after driving for the team part-time for the previous two years (in the No. 16 in 2020 and the No. 10 in 2019) with much success.
 On December 3, 2020, it was revealed that Caesar Bacarella would be expanding his part-time schedule with DGM Racing to between 10 and 15 races in 2021, after previously running 6 and 3 races for them in 2020 and 2019, respectively. All of his starts have come in the team's No. 90 car, which will be the entry he drives again in 2021. Bacarella hopes to eventually drive full-time with DGM.
 On December 8, 2020, it was reported that ex-Formula 3 and Formula 2 and current IndyCar Series driver Santino Ferrucci could be coming to NASCAR to run up to 20 Xfinity Series races with Our Motorsports in 2021. On January 8, 2021, it was announced that Ferrucci joined Sam Hunt Racing to drive part-time on mile-and-a-half tracks for the season. Brandon Gdovic and Kris Wright will also make a few starts for Sam Hunt.
 On December 8, 2020, B. J. McLeod Motorsports announced that Jesse Little would drive the No. 78 full-time in 2021. Little drove the No. 4 car for JD Motorsports in 2020.
 On December 10, 2020, it was announced that Myatt Snider would return to Richard Childress Racing in 2021, driving the No. 2 full-time after driving the No. 21 part-time in 2020. This will be his second full season in the Xfinity Series, as he ran the rest of the races in 2020 in the No. 93 for RSS/Reaume Brothers Racing.
 On December 14, 2020, it was announced that Patrick Emerling would return to run another part-time schedule with Our Motorsports, although now in the No. 03 as Brett Moffitt is running full-time in the No. 02 that Emerling drove in his one start in 2020. With Our Motorsports acquiring the No. 23 car from RSS/Reaume Brothers Racing, Emerling drove the No. 23 instead of the No. 03.
 On December 23, 2020, MBM Motorsports owner Carl Long posted on Facebook that the team is looking for a driver who brings sponsorship to run full-time in one of their Xfinity cars. This driver will join Timmy Hill, Chad Finchum and Stephen Leicht, who were previously announced to return to MBM in 2021. On February 11, 2021, it was announced that David Starr would drive the team's No. 13 full-time, although he would not run the season-opener at Daytona. He drove for MBM in three Cup Series races in 2017. When the No. 13 started to fail to qualify for races without practice and qualifying due to being too low in owner points, Starr would instead drive either the No. 61 or No. 66 for MBM.
 On January 11, 2021, it was announced that Miguel Paludo would be returning to NASCAR and would drive the JR Motorsports No. 8 in the road course races at the Daytona RC, COTA, and Mid-Ohio. This was his first time in the Xfinity Series since 2012 and first time in NASCAR since 2013 in the Truck Series. After being unable to find a NASCAR ride for 2014, Paludo returned to his home country of Brazil and has competed in the Porsche GT3 Carrera Cup Series since 2015.
 On January 19, 2021, Jade Buford was announced as the driver of the Big Machine Racing's No. 48 in 2021, running full-time and for Rookie of the Year. Buford drove in the Xfinity Series road course races in 2020 for SS-Green Light Racing with Big Machine Records as his sponsor. He was not approved by NASCAR to race at Daytona to start the season, so his first race will be at the Daytona Road Course the following week. Buford has only competed on road courses in a stock car. On Point Motorsports Truck Series driver Danny Bohn made his Xfinity debut substituting for Buford at Daytona.
 On January 22, 2021, JD Motorsports announced that Landon Cassill would return full-time to the Xfinity Series in the No. 4 Chevrolet, replacing Jesse Little, who left for B. J. McLeod Motorsports. Cassill previously drove for Shepherd Racing Ventures, starting and parking their No. 89 early in the season. When Shepherd's team stopped attempting races after COVID-19, Cassill was without a ride for the rest of 2020. Cassill has driven for JDM in the past, including in 2014 where he finished 12th in the standings.
 On January 25, 2021, it was announced that Ryan Vargas would drive full-time for JD Motorsports in 2021 in the team's No. 6 car and competing for Rookie of the Year honors. Vargas previously drove JDM's No. 15 part-time in 2019 and the Nos. 6 and 15 in 2020.
 On February 5, 2021, RSS Racing and Reaume Brothers Racing announced that Natalie Decker would make her Xfinity debut at the Daytona Road Course, the first of five races she would run in their No. 23. After Our Motorsports partnered with the two teams to operate the No. 23 car for the rest of the season beginning at Las Vegas in March, it was confirmed that Decker would still be in the car for the four remaining races on her schedule. Our had yet to select a driver to be in the No. 03 for all four of those races.
 On March 31, 2021, NASCAR announced that drivers Josh Reaume and Mike Wallace had been reinstated. Both drivers were suspended after making posts on social media in November and September 2020, respectfully, that violated Sections 12.1 and 12.8.1.e (member conduct guidelines) of the NASCAR Rule Book. Reaume competed in two Xfinity Series races in 2020, one for Mike Harmon Racing and the other for his own team, Reaume Brothers Racing (with RSS Racing). Wallace competed in three of the road course races in the series in 2020 for JD Motorsports.
 On May 3, 2021, Our Motorsports announced that Tanner Berryhill would drive the No. 23 at Darlington in May and both Texas races. This is Berryhill's first start in the series since 2014 (although he did have 1 DNQ in both 2015 and 2018), and first start in NASCAR since 2018, when he drove for Obaika Racing in the last two races of the Cup Series season.
 On May 10, 2021, it was revealed through the release of the entry list for the race at Dover that JD Motorsports drivers Landon Cassill (No. 4), and Ryan Vargas (No. 6), would be switching cars for that race. The move was made because the following week's race at Circuit of the Americas will have qualifying and a field of 36 cars instead of 40, and Vargas' No. 6 is low enough in owner points (37th before the race at Dover) that it has a chance of failing to qualify while the No. 4 is high enough (21st) to qualify.
 On May 14, 2021, Kaulig Racing announced that Zane Smith would drive the No. 11 at Dover as a substitute for Justin Haley, who was sidelined in accordance with team and COVID-19 protocols. This will be Smith's first race since he drove the No. 8 part-time for JR Motorsports in 2019.
 On May 21, 2021, 2000 NASCAR Busch Series Champion Jeff Green announced his retirement from both racing and crew chiefing in NASCAR.
 On July 8, Rick Ware Racing announced that Andrew Ranger, their NASCAR Pinty's Series driver, would drive the No. 17 entry at New Hampshire, but the deal fell through and J. J. Yeley drove the car instead of Ranger.
 On July 10, 2021, JR Motorsports announced that Austin Dillon would drive the No. 1 car at Atlanta as a substitute for Michael Annett, who suffered a leg injury while he was exercising a few weeks before. On July 12, Josh Berry was announced as Annett's substitute at New Hampshire. Despite missing the two races, Annett was granted a playoff waiver by NASCAR. After returning at Watkins Glen, Annett's injury worsened when competing in that race and as a result, he did not run the next two races. Annett was replaced by Chase Elliott at the Indy Road Course and Berry at Michigan. Berry again drove the No. 1 at Bristol, Las Vegas (a race which he would win) and Talladega after Annett reinjured his leg while working out. Annett returned from his injury for the race at the Charlotte Roval and would also drive the car at Texas and Kansas.
 On August 31, 2021, Jordan Anderson Racing announced that Austin Dillon would drive the No. 31 at the Sport Clips Haircuts VFW Help a Hero 200 at Darlington.
 On September 4, 2021, Our Motorsports announced that Ty Dillon would drive the No. 02 that day in the race at Darlington as a substitute for Brett Moffitt, who was out for unspecified medical reasons. Dillon would also fill in for Moffitt at the Richmond fall race. On September 22, Jordan Anderson Racing announced that Dillon would drive their No. 31 at Las Vegas.
 On September 10, 2021, JD Motorsports announced that Colby Howard would not be driving their No. 15 car for the remainder of the season starting at Richmond. This came after Howard announced that he would leave the team to drive for McAnally-Hilgemann Racing full-time in the Truck Series in 2022. Bayley Currey would drive the car at Richmond, Las Vegas, Talladega, Texas and Kansas, B. J. McLeod drove it at Bristol, and Kris Wright drove it at the Charlotte Roval.
 On October 20, 2021, NASCAR and SS-Green Light Racing indefinitely suspended Carson Ware after he was arrested on a misdemeanor charge of assaulting a female, simple assault, and injury to personal property. Ware, who was going to drive the SSGLR No. 17 in that weekend's race at Kansas, was replaced by Garrett Smithley.

Crew chiefs
 On November 13, 2020, it was announced that Travis Mack, previously the crew chief for Michael Annett and the No. 1 car for JR Motorsports, would be leaving for the new Trackhouse Racing Team in the Cup Series to crew chief Daniel Suárez's No. 99 car.
 On November 17, 2020, Joe Gibbs Racing announced changes to their crew chief lineup in 2021.
 Chris Gayle, previously the crew chief of JGR's No. 20 Cup Series team, will move to the Xfinity Series and be the crew chief of the No. 54 team, replacing Jacob Canter, who was serving as that team's crew chief in addition to his position as JGR's test team manager.
 Jason Ratcliff, previously the crew chief of the JGR-aligned No. 95 Leavine Family Racing team in the Cup Series, which has closed down, will move back to the Xfinity Series and crew chief the No. 20 of Harrison Burton, replacing Ben Beshore. Ratcliff previously crew chiefed the same car when it was driven by Christopher Bell.
 Ben Beshore will move to the Cup Series and replace Adam Stevens (who moves to the No. 20 JGR Cup team, replacing Gayle) as the crew chief of the No. 18 of Kyle Busch.
 On November 23, 2020, Mark Setzer, previously a JD Motorsports crew chief, tweeted that he would be moving to the Jeremy Clements Racing No. 51 team as its crew chief in 2021. He replaces Andrew Abbott, who moved over to Sam Hunt Racing to crew chief their No. 26 car, replacing Eddie Troconis, who became the crew chief of the Young's Motorsports No. 02 in the Truck Series.
 On December 10, 2020, JR Motorsports announced that Mike Bumgarner, who spent the previous seven years as the team's director of race operations, would serve as the crew chief for the No. 1 of Michael Annett. JRM has yet to announce who will replace Bumgarner as the director of race operations when he returns to crew chiefing.
 On December 14, 2020, JD Motorsports announced that Wayne Carroll Jr. would be Colby Howard's crew chief in 2021 on the No. 15 car. Carroll crew chiefed JDM's No. 6 car in most of the races in 2020. Howard was crew chiefed by Mark Setzer, who left the team for the No. 51 of Jeremy Clements, in all but one of his starts in 2020. (Carroll crew chiefed Howard in the one race where Setzer did not).
 On December 14, 2020, Danny Johnson was announced as the crew chief of Our Motorsports' new second full-time car, the No. 03. He previously was with Martins Motorsports, working as their crew chief during the first half of the 2020 season.
 On January 19, 2021, it was announced that Patrick Donahue would be the crew chief for the new Big Machine Racing and the No. 48 of Jade Buford. Donahue worked for SS-Green Light Racing for the last three years, crew chiefing Joey Gase in 2018, Gray Gaulding in 2019, and Joe Graf Jr. in 2020. On February 5, 2021, first-year crew chief Mike Tyska, who previously worked at Germain Racing, GMS Racing, and Rick Ware Racing during his career, was announced as Graf's new crew chief, replacing Donahue.
 On January 27, 2021, Kaulig Racing announced that Jason Trinchere, who had served as the lead race engineer on the No. 11 car driven by Justin Haley during the 2020 season, would serve as crew chief for the No. 16 driven by A. J. Allmendinger. It was also announced that Matt Swiderski, who was previously the crew chief for Team Penske's part-time No. 12 car in the Xfinity Series, would join Kaulig to serve as crew chief for their part-time Cup team, the No. 16, driven by Kaz Grala, Allmendinger, and other drivers.
 On February 1, 2021, it had been announced that Shannon Rursch would become the full-time crew chief of Josh Williams' No. 92 for DGM Racing. Williams worked with a rotation of 12 different crew chiefs in 2020. However, this did not end up happening, as instead of Rursch, Ryan London was listed as the team's crew chief for the first two races of the season and then Eddie Troconis was for the next two races. All three of them also work for other teams in addition to the No. 92. (Rursch works for Venturini Motorsports in ARCA while London and Troconis work for Young's Motorsports in the Truck Series.) Steven Hazelbaker made his crew chiefing debut at Phoenix in March with Williams and the No. 92.
 On February 2, 2021, it was announced that DGM Racing crew chief Nathan Kennedy would move with the Bassett brothers, who both previously drove part-time for DGM, to their new team in the series, the No. 77.
 On April 1, 2021, it was announced that Mark Hillman, who had joined MBM Motorsports at the start of the season to crew chief Timmy Hill and their No. 66 Xfinity Series car, would be leaving for McAnally-Hilgemann Racing to be the crew chief for Derek Kraus in the Truck Series.
 On May 3, 2021, RSS Racing announced that Shane Wilson would rejoin the team as the crew chief for Ryan Sieg's No. 39. He was the crew chief for the same car in 2019. He left for David Gilliland Racing to crew chief Tanner Gray's No. 15 in the Truck Series in 2020. DGR released him on April 30, 2021. On August 18, 2021, NASCAR announced that Wilson would be suspended for four races after the car lost its left rear tire and caused a caution during the Indy Road Course race. Later in the day, RSS Racing announced that Wilson would be completely relieved of his duties, and Kevin Starland returned as Sieg's crew chief starting at Michigan.

Interim crew chiefs
 On June 14, 2021, Dustin Albino from Jayski tweeted that Jason Trinchere, the crew chief of Kaulig Racing's No. 16 car driven by A. J. Allmendinger, would miss the race at Nashville because his wife was expecting a baby. Justin Cox would be the interim crew chief for the team in that race. Cox was one of multiple crew chiefs of the No. 16 in 2020 when Allmedinger ran part-time in the car.
 On September 4, 2021, JR Motorsports announced that engineer Allen Hart would fill in as crew chief for Justin Allgaier and the No. 7 team in that day's race at Darlington, as Jason Burdett was forced to miss the race due to COVID-19 protocols. Jason Ratcliff, the crew chief for Harrison Burton's No. 20, also had to miss the race (Joe Gibbs Racing did not announce why), and engineer Dustin Zacharyasz filled in as crew chief.
 On October 26, 2021, NASCAR suspended Our Motorsports No. 23 crew chief Kenneth Roettger Jr. for four Xfinity points races after the car lost a ballast during the Kansas playoff race. Ronnie Osmer, who crew chiefed the team's No. 03 car when it did not qualify for races due to being too low in owner points, would fill in as the interim crew chief of the No. 23.

Manufacturers
 On January 11, 2021, after over 10 seasons with Chevrolet and ECR Engines, RSS Racing announced its manufacturer switch to Ford, with engines supplied by Roush-Yates Engines. However, this change would only be for the team's No. 39 car, as the No. 23 (previously No. 93) car, fielded jointly with Reaume Brothers Racing and later Our Motorsports, as well as their ARCA car, would still remain Chevrolets.

Sponsorship
 On November 19, 2020, it was announced that Bass Pro Shops, TrueTimber, and Black Rifle Coffee would sponsor Noah Gragson's No. 9 for JR Motorsports in all 33 races in 2021. The three companies sponsored him in 21 races in 2020.
 On December 10, 2020, it was announced that TaxSlayer would continue to sponsor Myatt Snider at Richard Childress Racing in 2021, although this year, it would (along with Snider's schedule) be for all 33 races. This is the first time in the company's time as a NASCAR sponsor that they have been a primary sponsor on a car after many years of sponsoring teams part-time.
 On December 10, 2020, Monster Energy was announced as the primary sponsor of the Stewart-Haas Racing No. 98 team for the majority of the 2021 schedule, moving over with Riley Herbst from the Joe Gibbs Racing No. 18.
 On December 21, 2020, it was announced that First Pacific Funding would increase their presence on Jeremy Clements Racing's No. 51 after sponsoring the team twice in 2020. On January 3, 2021, Clements announced that Diecast Kings would also sponsor an increased number of races with his team in 2021, after sponsoring him once in 2020.
 On December 23, 2020, it was revealed that RoofClaim.com, which was the primary sponsor for MBM Motorsports, would not return to the team in 2021 due to lack of airtime on the TV broadcasts and the COVID-19 pandemic resulting in the lack of exposure with fans at the track.
 On January 25, 2021, Jordan Anderson Racing announced that Bommarito Automotive Group, one of the most prominent sponsors on their Truck Series No. 3 team, would sponsor the team's new Xfinity Series car, the No. 31, in multiple races.
 On February 8, 2021, Offerpad was announced as the primary sponsor of the Joe Gibbs Racing No. 20 for four races in 2021.
 On March 2, 2021, it was announced that Dogecoin would return as a NASCAR sponsor and would be on Stefan Parsons' No. 99 for B. J. McLeod Motorsports at Las Vegas in March. The cryptocurrency company was previously a sponsor on Stefan's father Phil's former Cup Series team, Phil Parsons Racing, in 2014 with Josh Wise. Its users came together to win Wise the fan vote for the 2014 All-Star Race.

Schedule

Daytona, Phoenix, Texas, and Circuit of the Americas revealed their race dates ahead of the release of the entire schedule, which NASCAR announced on October 30, 2020.

Note: The Dash 4 Cash races (the spring races at Martinsville, Talladega, Darlington and Dover) are listed in bold.

Schedule changes

 Circuit of the Americas (in Austin, Texas) is added for the first time.
 Nashville Superspeedway returns for the first time since 2011.
 Auto Club Speedway, Chicagoland Speedway, Iowa Speedway and Kentucky Speedway are removed from the schedule.
 Auto Club Speedway was initially on the schedule, but was replaced by an event at the Daytona Road Course due to COVID-19 regulations.
 Atlanta and Martinsville will go from hosting one race to two. This is the first time Atlanta has hosted two races, while Martinsville will host two races for the first time since 1994.
 Bristol and Dover will go from having two races on the schedule to one as the Bristol race will be the paved event. (The Xfinity Series will not race on the Bristol dirt weekend.)
 The Darlington (spring) and Talladega (fall) races added during COVID-19 schedule changes will be kept.
 The fall Texas and Kansas weekends swapped spots, with Texas being the Round of 8 opener and Kansas being the middle race.

Results and standings

Race results

Drivers' championship

(key) Bold – Pole position awarded by time. Italics – Pole position set by final practice results or owner's points. * – Most laps led. 1 – Stage 1 winner. 2 – Stage 2 winner 1–10 – Regular season top 10 finishers.
. – Eliminated after Round of 12
. – Eliminated after Round of 8

Owners' championship (Top 15)
(key) Bold – Pole position awarded by time. Italics – Pole position set by final practice results or owner's points. * – Most laps led. 1 – Stage 1 winner. 2 – Stage 2 winner 1–10 – Regular season top 10 finishers.
. – Eliminated after Round of 12
. – Eliminated after Round of 8

NOTE:  The No. 54 Joe Gibbs Racing Toyota used an ineligible driver in selected races and could not acquire bonus points for those races.

Manufacturers' Championship

See also
 2021 NASCAR Cup Series
 2021 NASCAR Camping World Truck Series
 2021 ARCA Menards Series
 2021 ARCA Menards Series East
 2021 ARCA Menards Series West
 2021 NASCAR Whelen Modified Tour
 2021 NASCAR Pinty's Series
 2021 NASCAR PEAK Mexico Series
 2021 NASCAR Whelen Euro Series
 2021 eNASCAR iRacing Pro Invitational Series
 2021 SRX Series

References

Xfinity
 
NASCAR Xfinity Series seasons